Qarah Khan (also Romanized as Qarah Khān and Qareh Khān) is a village in Eshqabad Rural District, Miyan Jolgeh District, Nishapur County, Razavi Khorasan Province, Iran. At the 2006 census, its population was 195, in 44 families.

References 

Populated places in Nishapur County